Edward Earle Vaile  (3 March 1869 – 11 January 1956) was a real estate agent, farmer, philanthropist, author, railway campaigner and a pioneer of the pumice country - Broadlands, North Island, New Zealand.

Vaile was born at Hampstead, London, England in 1869. He was a very strong advocate for the building of a government railway between Rotorua and Taupo via Waiotapu and Reporoa. From 1911 onwards he led campaigns and lobbied vigorously for many years to have a railway built between Rotorua and Taupo. He formed and led the Rotorua Taupo Railway League and the Reporoa Railway League, and in 1928 published a campaign pamphlet advocating the construction of a railway between Rotorua and Taupo. In 1929 published another campaign pamphlet titled "The truth about the Taupo railway - the story of a great crime" advocating the need for and the numerous benefits such a line would bring, in response to the government stopping the project in that year. The United and Reform Parties had formed the United/Reform Coalition, and Vaile was heavily beaten by both the official coalition and the Labour candidates.

In the 1952 Queen's Birthday Honours, Vaile was appointed an Officer of the Order of the British Empire, for services to the community in Auckland.

Bibliography
 Encyclopedia of New Zealand 1966, A. H. McLintock; Government Printer, Wellington, 1966
 Pioneering the Pumice, E. Earle Vaile; Whitcombe and Tombs Limited, 1939
 Some Interesting Occurrences in Early Auckland City and Provinces, E Earle Vaile; Whitcombe and Tombs Limited, 1955
 The New Century in Rotorua, D. M. Stafford/Rotorua District Council; Ray Richards Publisher, Auckland, 1988 
 Don Stafford Collection – Railways; Rotorua Public Library, Rotorua 
 Rotorua Taupo Railway League campaign pamphlet; Rotorua Taupo Railway League, 1928
 The Truth about the Taupo Railway - The Story of a Great Crime pamphlet; Rotorua Taupo Railway League, 1929
 Waitakere City Council - Waikumete Cemetery records

References

External links 

 Entry in Encyclopedia of New Zealand 1966
 Entry on Bush Sickness

1956 deaths
1869 births
New Zealand Officers of the Order of the British Empire
New Zealand philanthropists
New Zealand farmers
English emigrants to New Zealand
People from Hampstead
Burials at Waikumete Cemetery
Unsuccessful candidates in the 1931 New Zealand general election